= Threshold of toxilogical concern =

The threshold of toxicological concern (or TTC) is a method for determining the level of exposure to chemicals above which would be considered toxic, in cases where data about such chemicals is scarce or non-existent.

The principle of the TTC can be applied to avoiding animal testing using the concept of exposure based waiving (EBW), where, if a threshold of concern in terms of human exposure can be identified from historic toxicology testing data, further animal testing can be waived on the basis of the individual chemical structures and existing toxicology data for the class of chemicals. This principle has been applied to the waiving of complex animal inhalation toxicology testing in particular (Exposure based waiving: the application of the toxicological threshold of concern (TTC) to inhalation exposure for aerosol ingredients in consumer products.
